Severny (masculine), Severnaya (feminine), or Severnoye (neuter) is the name of several inhabited localities in Russia.

Modern inhabited localities

Republic of Adygea
As of 2010, one rural locality in the Republic of Adygea bears this name:
Severny, Republic of Adygea, a settlement under the administrative jurisdiction of the city of Maykop

Altai Krai
As of 2010, one rural locality in Altai Krai bears this name:
Severny, Altai Krai, a settlement in Severny Selsoviet of Pervomaysky District

Amur Oblast
As of 2010, one rural locality in Amur Oblast bears this name:
Severnoye, Amur Oblast, a selo in Severny Rural Settlement of Arkharinsky District

Republic of Bashkortostan
As of 2010, two rural localities in the Republic of Bashkortostan bear this name:
Severny, Republic of Bashkortostan, a village in Almukhametovsky Selsoviet of Abzelilovsky District
Severnaya, Republic of Bashkortostan, a village in Oktyabrsky Selsoviet of Sterlitamaksky District

Belgorod Oblast
As of 2010, one urban locality in Belgorod Oblast bears this name:
Severny, Belgorod Oblast, a settlement in Belgorodsky District

Republic of Buryatia
As of 2010, one rural locality in the Republic of Buryatia bears this name:
Severny, Republic of Buryatia, a settlement in Severny Selsoviet of Bauntovsky District

Chelyabinsk Oblast
As of 2010, four rural localities in Chelyabinsk Oblast bear this name:
Severny, Kyshtym, Chelyabinsk Oblast, a settlement under the administrative jurisdiction of the city of Kyshtym
Severny, Kusinsky District, Chelyabinsk Oblast, a settlement in Zlokazovsky Selsoviet of Kusinsky District
Severny, Nagaybaksky District, Chelyabinsk Oblast, a settlement in Kulikovsky Selsoviet of Nagaybaksky District
Severny, Sosnovsky District, Chelyabinsk Oblast, a settlement in Kremenkulsky Selsoviet of Sosnovsky District

Chuvash Republic
As of 2010, one rural locality in the Chuvash Republic bears this name:
Severny, Chuvash Republic, a settlement under the administrative jurisdiction of the city of Cheboksary

Republic of Kalmykia
As of 2010, two rural localities in the Republic of Kalmykia bear this name:
Severny, Republic of Kalmykia, a settlement in Idzhilskaya Rural Administration of Oktyabrsky District
Severnoye, Republic of Kalmykia, a selo in Severnaya Rural Administration of Lagansky District

Republic of Karelia
As of 2010, one rural locality in the Republic of Karelia bears this name:
Severny, Republic of Karelia, a settlement in Muyezersky District

Kemerovo Oblast
As of 2010, two rural localities in Kemerovo Oblast bear this name:
Severny, Kemerovo Oblast, a settlement in Metallurgskaya Rural Territory of Mezhdurechensky District
Severnaya, Kemerovo Oblast, a village in Pashkovskaya Rural Territory of Tyazhinsky District

Kirov Oblast
As of 2010, three rural localities in Kirov Oblast bear this name:
Severny, Omutninsky District, Kirov Oblast, a settlement in Zalazninsky Rural Okrug of Omutninsky District
Severny, Oparinsky District, Kirov Oblast, a settlement in Rechnoy Rural Okrug of Oparinsky District
Severny, Yuryansky District, Kirov Oblast, a settlement in Ivanovsky Rural Okrug of Yuryansky District

Komi Republic
As of 2010, one urban locality in the Komi Republic bears this name:
Severny, Komi Republic, an urban-type settlement under the administrative jurisdiction of the town of Vorkuta

Kostroma Oblast
As of 2010, two rural localities in Kostroma Oblast bear this name:
Severny, Kostroma Oblast, a settlement in Pyshchugskoye Settlement of Pyshchugsky District
Severnoye, Kostroma Oblast, a selo in Severnoye Settlement of Susaninsky District

Kurgan Oblast
As of 2010, three rural localities in Kurgan Oblast bear this name:
Severny, Kurgan Oblast, a village in Trudovskoy Selsoviet of Zverinogolovsky District
Severnoye, Kurgan Oblast, a village in Kashirinsky Selsoviet of Ketovsky District
Severnaya, Kurgan Oblast, a village in Severny Selsoviet of Kargapolsky District

Kursk Oblast
As of 2013, two rural localities in Kursk Oblast bear this name:
Severny, Kursky District, Kursk Oblast, a settlement in Nizhnemedveditsky Selsoviet of Kursky District
Severny, Ponyrovsky District, Kursk Oblast, a khutor in Pervomaysky Selsoviet of Ponyrovsky District

Lipetsk Oblast
As of 2010, one rural locality in Lipetsk Oblast bears this name:
Severny, Lipetsk Oblast, a settlement in Lipovsky Selsoviet of Volovsky District

Mari El Republic
As of 2010, one rural locality in the Mari El Republic bears this name:
Severny, Mari El Republic, a vyselok in Krasnoyarsky Rural Okrug of Zvenigovsky District

Moscow Oblast
As of 2010, two inhabited localities in Moscow Oblast bear this name:
Severny, Taldomsky District, Moscow Oblast, an urban locality (a work settlement) in Taldomsky District
Severny, Istrinsky District, Moscow Oblast, a rural locality (a settlement) in Luchinskoye Rural Settlement of Istrinsky District

Nizhny Novgorod Oblast
As of 2010, four rural localities in Nizhny Novgorod Oblast bear this name:
Severny, Dzerzhinsk, Nizhny Novgorod Oblast, a settlement under the administrative jurisdiction of the city of Dzerzhinsk
Severny, Shakhunsky District, Nizhny Novgorod Oblast, a settlement in Khmelevitsky Selsoviet of Shakhunsky District
Severny, Varnavinsky District, Nizhny Novgorod Oblast, a settlement in Severny Selsoviet of Varnavinsky District
Severny, Voskresensky District, Nizhny Novgorod Oblast, a settlement in Vozdvizhensky Selsoviet of Voskresensky District

Novosibirsk Oblast
As of 2010, two rural localities in Novosibirsk Oblast bear this name:
Severny, Novosibirsk Oblast, a settlement in Kolyvansky District
Severnoye, Novosibirsk Oblast, a selo in Severny District

Omsk Oblast
As of 2010, six rural localities in Omsk Oblast bear this name:
Severny, Boyevoy Rural Okrug, Isilkulsky District, Omsk Oblast, a settlement in Boyevoy Rural Okrug of Isilkulsky District
Severny, Lesnoy Rural Okrug, Isilkulsky District, Omsk Oblast, a settlement in Lesnoy Rural Okrug of Isilkulsky District
Severnoye, Cherlaksky District, Omsk Oblast, a village in Solyansky Rural Okrug of Cherlaksky District
Severnoye, Moskalensky District, Omsk Oblast, a village in Elitovsky Rural Okrug of Moskalensky District
Severnoye, Sherbakulsky District, Omsk Oblast, a village in Izyumovsky Rural Okrug of Sherbakulsky District
Severnaya, Omsk Oblast, a village in Alexeyevsky Rural Okrug of Gorkovsky District

Orenburg Oblast
As of 2010, three rural localities in Orenburg Oblast bear this name:
Severny, Alexandrovsky District, Orenburg Oblast, a settlement in Romanovsky Selsoviet of Alexandrovsky District
Severny, Sakmarsky District, Orenburg Oblast, a settlement in Svetly Selsoviet of Sakmarsky District
Severnoye, Orenburg Oblast, a selo in Severny Selsoviet of Severny District

Rostov Oblast
As of 2010, three rural localities in Rostov Oblast bear this name:
Severny, Oblivsky District, Rostov Oblast, a settlement in Oblivskoye Rural Settlement of Oblivsky District
Severny, Tselinsky District, Rostov Oblast, a khutor in Kirovskoye Rural Settlement of Tselinsky District
Severny, Vesyolovsky District, Rostov Oblast, a settlement in Verkhnesolenovskoye Rural Settlement of Vesyolovsky District

Ryazan Oblast
As of 2010, one rural locality in Ryazan Oblast bears this name:
Severny, Ryazan Oblast, a settlement in Murminsky Rural Okrug of Ryazansky District

Samara Oblast
As of 2010, two rural localities in Samara Oblast bear this name:
Severny, Klyavlinsky District, Samara Oblast, a settlement in Klyavlinsky District
Severny, Shentalinsky District, Samara Oblast, a settlement in Shentalinsky District

Saratov Oblast
As of 2010, two rural localities in Saratov Oblast bear this name:
Severny, Khvalynsky District, Saratov Oblast, a settlement in Khvalynsky District
Severny, Ozinsky District, Saratov Oblast, a settlement in Ozinsky District

Stavropol Krai
As of 2010, three rural localities in Stavropol Krai bear this name:
Severny, Shpakovsky District, Stavropol Krai, a settlement in Shpakovsky District
Severny, Stepnovsky District, Stavropol Krai, a khutor in Stepnovsky District
Severnoye, Stavropol Krai, a selo in Alexandrovsky District

Sverdlovsk Oblast
As of 2010, two rural localities in Sverdlovsk Oblast bear this name:
Severny, Sverdlovsk Oblast, a settlement under the administrative jurisdiction of the town of Ivdel
Severnaya, Sverdlovsk Oblast, a village in Verkhnesaldinsky District

Tambov Oblast
As of 2010, one rural locality in Tambov Oblast bears this name:
Severny, Tambov Oblast, a settlement in Kovylsky Selsoviet of Kirsanovsky District

Tomsk Oblast
As of 2010, one rural locality in Tomsk Oblast bears this name:
Severny, Tomsk Oblast, a settlement in Alexandrovsky District

Tver Oblast
As of 2010, one rural locality in Tver Oblast bears this name:
Severny, Tver Oblast, a settlement in Krasnokholmsky District

Tyumen Oblast
As of 2010, one rural locality in Tyumen Oblast bears this name:
Severnaya, Tyumen Oblast, a village in Aromashevsky District

Udmurt Republic
As of 2010, one rural locality in the Udmurt Republic bears this name:
Severny, Udmurt Republic, a selo in Severny Selsoviet of Sarapulsky District

Volgograd Oblast
As of 2010, two rural localities in Volgograd Oblast bear this name:
Severny, Bykovsky District, Volgograd Oblast, a settlement in Krasnoseltsevsky Selsoviet of Bykovsky District
Severny, Svetloyarsky District, Volgograd Oblast, a settlement in Narimanovsky Selsoviet of Svetloyarsky District

Vologda Oblast
As of 2010, two rural localities in Vologda Oblast bear this name:
Severny, Velikoustyugsky District, Vologda Oblast, a settlement in Susolovsky Selsoviet of Velikoustyugsky District
Severny, Vytegorsky District, Vologda Oblast, a settlement in Devyatinsky Selsoviet of Vytegorsky District

Abolished inhabited localities
Severny, Sakha Republic, a former urban locality (a settlement) in the Sakha Republic, abolished in 2004